The Labour Party governed the United Kingdom of Great Britain and Northern Ireland from 1974 to 1979. During this period, Harold Wilson and James Callaghan were successively appointed as Prime Minister by Queen Elizabeth II. The end of the Callaghan ministry was presaged by the Winter of Discontent, a period of serious industrial discontent. This was followed by the election of Conservative leader Margaret Thatcher in 1979.

Historian Kenneth O. Morgan states:

The government consisted of three ministries: the third and fourth Wilson ministry, and then the Callaghan ministry.


History

Formation

After the February 1974 general election, no party had a majority of seats. The incumbent Conservative Party won the popular vote, but Labour took a plurality of seats. Edward Heath, the Conservative Prime Minister, attempted to negotiate a coalition agreement with the Liberal Party, but resigned as Prime Minister after failing to do so. The Labour Party, led by Harold Wilson, then established a minority government, which took office on 4 March 1974.

It was recognised that this had no long-term stability, and that another general election was likely within a few months. On 20 September Wilson called another general election for 10 October, which resulted in a narrow victory for the Labour Party with a majority of three seats.

The economy was in recession by the time of the February 1974 election, but economic growth was re-established by 1976—although inflation, which had run into double digits before Labour came to power, was now above 20%. It would remain high for the rest of this ministry, rarely falling below 10%. Unemployment was now well in excess of 1,000,000 people, whereas it had been less than 600,000 at the start of the decade. This was the result of the economic decline, as well as advancing engineering techniques which required fewer personnel, along with other factors including the closure of unprofitable factories and coalmines.

In March 1976, having just turned sixty years old, Wilson resigned as Prime Minister, ending his leadership of the Labour Party after thirteen years, and a total of nearly eight years as Prime Minister. He was replaced by James Callaghan, who had held senior government positions during both of Wilson's ministries, and had served as a Shadow Cabinet member in the early 1960s.

In 1976, Britain faced financial crisis. The Labour government was forced to apply to the International Monetary Fund (IMF) for a loan of nearly $4,000,000,000. IMF negotiators insisted on deep cuts in public expenditure, greatly affecting economic and social policy.

Within a year of Callaghan taking office, the narrow Labour majority was eliminated due to by-election defeats, prompting a vote of confidence which prevented the government's collapse and a general election from being called. In order to sustain the government, Labour formed the Lib-Lab pact in March 1977 and this remained in force for sixteen months. This minority government also managed to stay in power with unofficial deals with the Ulster Unionist Party and Scottish National Party.

By September 1978, economic growth was firmly re-established and inflation was below 10%, although unemployment now stood at a post-war high of 1,500,000. With most of the opinion polls showing a clear Labour lead, it was widely expected that Callaghan would call a general election that autumn, despite having another year to do so, in order to gain a majority and give his government the chance of surviving in office until 1983.

However, he resisted these calls and Britain began 1979 with Labour still in power and Callaghan still in charge, but his failure to call a general election during the autumn of 1978 would prove to be the end of this Labour government.

Major contributions
Although the 1974–1979 Labour Government faced a number of economic difficulties, it was nevertheless able to carry out a broad range of reforms during its time in office. During Harold Wilson's final premiership, from 1974 to 1976, a number of changes were carried out such as the introduction of new social security benefits and improvements in the rights of tenants. In March 1974, an additional £2,000,000,000 was announced for benefits, food subsidies, and housing subsidies, including a record 25% increase in the state pension. Council house rents were also frozen. Council house building continued on a substantial scale, although there was now a greater emphasis on modernising older properties rather than replacing them with new ones.

That year, national insurance benefits were increased by 13%, which brought pensions as a proportion of average earnings "up to a value equivalent to the previous high, which was reached in 1965 as a result of Labour legislation." In order to maintain the real value of these benefits in the long term, the government introduced legislation which linked future increases in pensions to higher incomes or wages. In 1974–1975, social spending was increased in real terms by 9%. In 1974, pensions were increased in real terms by 14%, while in early 1975 increases were made in family allowances. There were also significant increases in rate and rent subsidies, together with £500,000,000 worth of food subsidies.

An independent Advisory, Conciliation and Arbitration Service (now simply called Acas) (regarded as the brainchild of the trade union leader Jack Jones) was established, which according to Robert Taylor continues to provide "an impartial and impressive function in resolving disputes and encouraging good industrial relations practice." A Manpower Services Commission was set up to encourage a more active labour market policy to improve job placements and deal with unemployment. The Pay Board was abolished, while the Price Commission was provided with greater powers to control and delay price increases. In addition, the Rehabilitation of Offenders Act 1974 prohibited employers from discriminating against ex-offenders where offences were minor and committed a long time ago, and the Housing Rents and Subsidies Act 1975 gave power over rents back to local authorities.

To help those with disabilities, the government introduced an Invalid Care Allowance, a Mobility Allowance, a Non-Contributory Invalidity Pension for those unable to contribute through national insurance, and other measures. To combat child poverty, legislation to create a universal Child Benefit was passed in 1975 (a reform later implemented by the Callaghan government). To raise the living standards of those dependent on national insurance benefits, the government index-linked short-term benefits to the rate of inflation, while pensions and long-term benefits were tied to increases in prices or earnings, whichever was higher.

In 1975, a State Earnings Related Pension Scheme (SERPS) was introduced. A new pension, which was inflation-proofed and linked to earnings, was added to the basic pension which was to increase in line with earnings for the first time ever. This reform assisted women by linking pensions to the 'twenty best years' of earnings, and those who worked at home caring for children or others were counted as contributors. This scheme was reformed by the subsequent Thatcher ministry. The Sex Discrimination Act 1975 gave women the right in principle to equal access to jobs and equal treatment at work with men, while the Employment Protection Act 1975 introduced Statutory Maternity Leave. That same year, the wage stop was finally abolished. In addition, differentials between skilled and unskilled workers were narrowed as a result of egalitarian pay policies involving flat-rate increases.

The 1975 Social Security Pensions Act provided for equal access by men and women to employers' pension schemes and also included a home responsibilities provision ensuring that parents and those looking after elderly dependents could retain their pension rights in spite of employment breaks. As a means of combating sex discrimination within the social security system, the Act provided that in future married women would receive the same level of personal sickness or unemployment benefit. The Housing Finance Act 1974 increased aid to local authorities for slum clearance, introduced a system of "fair rents" in public and private sector unfurnished accommodation, and introduced rent rebates for council tenants. The Housing Act 1974 improved the Renovation Grants scheme, provided increased levels of aid to housing associations (which emerged as a popular alternative to council housing for people seeking to rent a home), and extended the role of the Housing Corporation. The Rent Act 1974 extended security of tenure to tenants of furnished properties, and allowed access to rent tribunals. The Community Land Act 1975 allowed for the taking into public control of development land, while the Child Benefits Act 1975 introduced an extra payment for single parents. A Resource Allocation Working Party was also set up to produce a formula for a more equitable distribution of healthcare expenditure. Anthony Crosland, while serving as a minister during Wilson's second ministry, made a decision to reform the level of Rate Support Grant, introducing a standard level of relief across the country to benefit poorer urban areas.

Circular 4/74 (1974) renewed pressure for moves towards comprehensive education (progress of which had stalled under the Heath ministry), while the industrial relations legislation passed under Edward Heath was repealed. The Health and Safety at Work Act 1974 set up a Health and Safety Commission and Executive and a legal framework for health and safety at work. The Employment Protection Act 1975 set up the Advisory, Conciliation and Arbitration Services (ACAS) to arbitrate in industrial disputes, enlarged the rights of employees and trade unions, extended the redundancy payments scheme, and provided redress against unfair dismissal. The legislation also provided for paid maternity leave and outlawed dismissal for pregnancy. The Act also obliged employers to pay their workers a minimum guaranteed payment "if they are laid off through no fault of their own." The Social Security Act 1975 introduced a maternity allowance fund, while the Sex Discrimination Act 1975 set up an Equal Opportunities Commission and outlawed gender discrimination (both indirect and direct). In addition, the Social Security Act of 1975 included progressive noise-induced hearing loss "in the list of prescribed diseases covered by the Industrial Injuries Scheme as Occupational Deafness."

The Woodworking Machines Regulations 1974, replacing the 1922 Regulations, came into operation on in November 1974. These regulations raised the standard of guarding of the most dangerous machines. Improvements were made to mineworkers' pensions, while the Coal Mines (Respirable Dust) Regulations 1975, which came into operation in October that year, were aimed at reducing the incidence of coal miners's pneumoconiosis. They prescribed permitted amounts of respirable dust at workplaces in coal mines as well as arrangements for the suppression and continuous sampling of dust, and they include a scheme for the medical supervision of workers at risk. The Protection of Eyes Regulations 1974 and 1975, replacing the 1938 Regulations, extended protection to those employed on construction sites as well as in factories. In addition, the Policyholders Protection Act 1975 introduced safeguards for customers of failed insurance companies.

Wilson's successor Callaghan, together with his ministers, also introduced a number of reforms during their time in office. The Supplementary Benefits Act 1976 gave every person over the age of sixteen, whose resources were not enough to meet his or her basic needs, the right to claim a supplementary pension if he or she had reached state pension age, and a supplementary allowance if he or she was less than this age. The Rent (Agricultural) Act 1976 provided security of tenure for agricultural workers in tied accommodation, while the Bail Act 1976 reformed bail conditions with courts having to explain refusal of bail. The Police Act 1976 set up a Police Complaints Board "to formalise the procedure for dealing with public complaints". The Education Act 1976 limited the taking up of independent and direct grant school places and required all local authorities who had failed to do so "to submit proposals for comprehensive schools", while the Housing (Homeless Persons) Act 1977 extended local council responsibility "to provide accommodation for homeless people in their area," and instituted the right of homeless families to a permanent local council tenancy. In addition, efforts were made under the Environment Secretary Peter Shore to redistribute resources toward deprived urban areas. The Inner Urban Areas Act 1978 allowed local authorities to assist declining industrial areas and central government provided new subsidies to those inner city areas with the most problems, while the 1978 Finance Act introduced profit-sharing schemes. In April 1976, a Child Interim Benefit for single-parent families was introduced, followed by a universal Child Benefit scheme the following year. On the 3rd of April 1979 the number of hours that lone parents had to work to qualify for Family Income Supplement was reduced from 30 to 24 per week.

The Callaghan Government also introduced a range of measures aimed at moderating pressures for wage rises and to create a favourable climate "for an orderly restoration of collective bargaining". These included the granting of family income supplements to bring the incomes of lower-paid workers up to the level of social security benefits, the lowering of marginal tax rates on smaller incomes by rises in personal allowances, and increases in children's allowances (which were payable to the mother). However, child tax allowances were lowered, which had the effect of reducing the take-home pay of fathers. The impact of consumer price rises was also mitigated by higher income limits for free school meals, an increased milk subsidy, and a substantial reduction in the duty on petrol. In addition, electricity prices were lowered for families in receipt of supplementary benefits.

The government came under fire from the British public in November 1977, when the Fire Brigades Union called its first national strike, in response to the government's refusal to grant firefighters a 30% pay rise. The strike lasted until after Christmas, and for its duration, Britain's fire services were operated by hastily trained army troops, whose Green Goddess vehicles dated from the 1950s and were considerably slower than the fire engines of the 1970s, and the troops lacked the breathing equipment available to fire brigades. Well over 100 people died in fires during the strike, with the worst tragedy occurring in Wednesbury, where four children died in a house fire.

The Training Opportunities Scheme, under which more than 90,000 people completed their training in 1976 and which catered mainly for people over 19 years old, was extended during 1977 to include provisions for training persons for self-employment. In addition, technician training was extended and the network of skillcentres continued to expand. In August 1977, a scheme for voluntary early retirement was introduced in the coal industry for men aged 62+ with at least twenty years of underground service, with weekly payments up to normal pensionable age. In January 1977, unions became authorized to lodge a claim on behalf of workers with the Advisory, Conciliation and Arbitration Service for an improvement in terms and conditions of employment on the grounds that existing terms and conditions were less favourable than the relevant recognized terms and conditions for the trade in the area or, where these did not exist, the general level. In February, sections of the Employment Act 1975 were brought into operation dealing with the qualifying hours for part-time work, thereby entitling large numbers of part-time workers to the same rights and job security as full-time workers. Also in February, employees became entitled to receive guarantee payments from their employers when laid off or on short time, while in April sections of the 1975 Employment Act were activated giving employees the right to paid time off work in order to perform certain public duties. The main provisions of the Race Relations Act 1976 came into force in June 1977, making it unlawful for an employer to discriminate in recruitment or dismissal or in the treatment of existing employees in matters of promotion, transfer, training or other benefits on the grounds of nationality, race, colour, colour, or ethic or national origins. A Commission for Racial Equality was established to work towards the elimination of discrimination the promotion of equality of opportunity, and good relations between persons of different racial groups.

In Scotland, the Community Service by Offenders Act 1978 introduced provisions whereby offenders might, under certain circumstances, be ordered by courts to undertake community work as an alternative to a prison sentence. This legislation brought Scotland in line with England and Wales where similar provisions already apply. The Mines (Precautions Against Inrushes) Regulations 1979 applied to all types of mines and made provision for measures to be taken against the hazard of inrushes of water or gas or material which flows when wet.

In housing policy, a shift of emphasis in housing policy towards rehabilitation was evident in the further increase in the number of General Improvement Areas and the number of Housing Action Areas declared. An Act of March 1977 makes provision, for a limited period, for benefits to be paid from the age of 64 to workers who agree to retire in order to free jobs for young unemployed people, in response to the rise of youth unemployment. A number of other improvements were introduced in 1977, with Attendance Allowances extended to cover disabled foster children and non-contributory disablement pensions extended to married women whose invalidity prevented them from carrying out their household tasks. In January 1977, regulations were issued which brought about a change in the administration of legislation governing fire precautions at places of work. Under these regulations the Health and Safety Executive retained full responsibility for fire safety in certain 'special' premises such as nuclear installations, coalmines and chemical plants, whereas responsibility for general fire precautions at places of work was transferred to local fire authorities. A number of new services and benefits for disabled people were also introduced. A Non-Contributory Invalidity Pension in lieu of ‘pocket money’ allowance for long-stay patients in mental hospitals was introduced. The therapeutic earnings limit for recipients of Invalidity Pension, Non-Contributory Invalidity Pension and Unemployability Supplement was raised while the Private Car Maintenance Allowance for War Pensioners was increased. From the 29th of August 1977, Attendance Allowance became payable to foster parents of disabled children, and was also extended to kidney patients dialysing at home. Industrial injury provisions for occupational deafness were introduced, and viral hepatitis and Vinyl Chloride Monomer induced diseases were prescribed as industrial diseases. Easing of conditions for entitlement to industrial death benefit in certain cases of death from pulmonary disease was carried out. £12.1 million was paid to the Rowntree Trust Family Fund for disabled children, while the terms of reference of the Rowntree Trust Family Fund were extended to include all severely disabled children. Limited right of appeal on diagnosis of pneumoconiosis was also introduced. A phasing in of a new behind-the-ear hearing aid for up 1 million hearing impaired people was carried out. Special hearing aids for children and young people were introduced. Audiology services were developed, Hearing Therapists were introduced, and the Blind Person’s tax allowance was increased. Improvements were made to the wheel-chair service, while further parking concessions were made for all ‘Orange Badge’ holders. In addition, the ‘Orange Badge’ scheme was extended to include the blind, and concessions to ‘Orange Badge’ holders at most tolled crossings were introduced. The petrol allowance was also restored and doubled for drivers of government-supplied invalid vehicles. Another measure was the extension of exemption from Road Tax (vehicle excise duty) to Mobility Allowance beneficiaries or their nominees. Concessionary fares for disabled people were introduced, along with a discretionary allowance of up to £160 to disabled students whose disability led to additional expenses in connection with their studies. Improved provision for the needs of disabled people in educational establishments was carried out, and a scheme of grants was made to employers “towards the cost of adaptations to premises or equipment made to enable disabled individuals to obtain, or retain, employment.” The 4th of July 1977 saw the inception of an experimental Job Introduction Scheme “to provide financial assistance enabling certain disabled people to undertake a trial period of employment with an employer, where there is reasonable doubt as to the person’s ability to perform a particular job.” On the 5th of July 1978 a revised and simplified scheme designed to help severely disabled people with their travel-to-work costs was introduced. Increased allowances were paid to people going on employment rehabilitation courses, while under the MSC Special Programme for young people additional opportunities were provided at Employment Rehabilitation Centres for disabled young people. A Release for Training (RFT) scheme was introduced for disabled people already in employment “but experiencing problems which can only be resolved by a period of intensive training.”  District Handicap Teams were set up, the War Pensioners’ visiting scheme was extended, and zero rating of VAT was introduced “on aids and appliances for disabled people and also on medical equipment for donation to a hospital for the purpose of treatment or research.” New arrangements were introduced for dental treatment of disabled patients, and special concessionary TV license arrangements were extended for people in old people’s homes.

The Safety Representatives and Committees Regulations of 1977 made provision for recognised trade unions to appoint health and safety representatives "and gave such representatives rights to representation and consultation on health and safety as well as rights to access to training and facilities to support them in undertaking these tasks." The Homes Insulation Act 1978 provided for grants to occupiers towards the cost of thermal insulation of their dwellings, while under the Safety Representatives and Safety Committees Regulations recognized trade unions were allowed to appoint safety representatives who would have certain rights and functions. As part of an extension in external consultation on the prevention of industrial accidents and occupationally induced diseases the Health and Safety Commission established three Industry Advisory Committees for construction, railways and oil and regulations were issued in March 1978 dealing with the packaging and labelling of some 800 dangerous chemicals commonly used at work and in the home. Improvements to the Mineworkers Sick Pay Scheme were also introduced from 1978, with improvement in the formula for calculating benefit improved and the period of 'waiting days' reduced from seven to three. The Home Purchase Assistance and Housing Corporation Guarantee Act 1978 gave help to first-time home buyers. The Consumer Safety Act 1978 protected consumers from purchasing potentially harmful goods, while the 1979 Credit Unions Act, the last piece of legislation passed by the Labour government, set up a legal structure for credit unions.

Fate

The union strikes affected Britain during the Winter of Discontent (1978–1979) as public services ground to a halt. Furthermore, inflation was back in double digits. The House of Commons passed a vote of no confidence in late March 1979, by one vote. That vote necessitated a general election, which the Conservatives won decisively even though polls showed Callaghan was personally more popular with the voters than Conservative leader Margaret Thatcher. The problem was that many Labour voters swung away from Labour.

Callaghan continued to lead Labour in opposition for eighteen months; his friendliest biographers take a negative view of the period. He stepped down to make way for Michael Foot, the leader of the leftist faction. Callaghan remained in parliament as an MP until 1987, having served in parliament for 42 years.

Historians Alan Sked and Chris Cook have summarized the views of some historians regarding Labour in power in 1974–1979:
If Wilson's record as Prime Minister was soon felt to have been one of failure, that sense of failure was powerfully reinforced by Callaghan's term as premier. Labour, it seemed, was incapable of positive achievements. It was unable to control inflation, unable to control the unions, unable to solve the Irish problem, unable to solve the Rhodesian question, unable to secure its proposals for Welsh and Scottish devolution, unable to reach a popular modus vivendi with the Common Market, unable even to maintain itself in power until it could go to the country and the date of its own choosing. It was little wonder, therefore, that Mrs. Thatcher resoundingly defeated it in 1979.

However, Alan Bailey in his 2013 article for the IPPR Progressive Policy Think Tank entitled: "Not all 'the bad old days': Revisiting Labour's 1970s industrial strategy" gives an alternative reading.

 The 'industrial strategy' of the 1974-79 Labour government has had a bad press. It is remembered, if at all, as a failed combination of left-wing Bennite extremism (planning agreements) and 'picking winners' (British Leyland). However, this caricature is unfair and misleading, and there are still lessons to be learned.

Cabinets

Wilson ministry

Callaghan ministry

{{Infobox government cabinet
|cabinet_name = Callaghan ministry
|incumbent = 1976–1979
|image = James Callaghan (1977).jpg
|caption = Callaghan (1977)
|date_formed = 
|date_dissolved = 
|government_head_title = Prime Minister
|government_head = James Callaghan
|government_head_history = 1976–1979
|deputy_government_head = 
|state_head_title = Monarch
|state_head = Queen Elizabeth II
|former_members_number =
|total_number =
|political_party =  Labour Party
|legislature_status = 
|opposition_cabinet = Thatcher Shadow Cabinet
|opposition_party =  Conservative Party
|opposition_leader = Margaret Thatcher
|last_election = 1979 general election
|legislature_term = {{Longitem|47th UK Parliament{{midsize|lost a vote of confidence}}}}
|budget =
|previous = Fourth Wilson ministry
|successor = First Thatcher ministry
}}

Full list of ministers
Members of the Cabinet are in bold face.

References
Notes

Sources

Further reading

 Bosanquet, Nick, and Peter Townsend, eds. Labour and Equality: A Fabian Study of Labour in Power, 1974–79 (Heinemann, 1980), 312pp.
 Butler, D., and G. Butler. Twentieth Century British Political Facts 1900–2000.
 Childs, David. Britain since 1945: A Political History (7th 2012), pp. 190–212.
 Conroy, Harry. James Callaghan (Haus, 2006).
 Dell, Edmund. The chancellors: a history of the chancellors of the Exchequer, 1945–90 (HarperCollins, 1997), pp. 400–48.
 Donoughue, Bernard. Prime Minister: Conduct of Policy Under Harold Wilson and James Callaghan, 1974–79 (Jonathan Cape, 1987).
 Dorey, Peter. "'Should I stay or should I go?’: James Callaghan's decision not to call an autumn 1978 general election." British Politics (2016) 11#1 pp. 95–118. abstract
 Harmon, Mark D. The British Labour government and the 1976 IMF crisis (St. Martin's Press, 1997).
 Hay, Colin. "Chronicles of a death foretold: The winter of discontent and construction of the crisis of British Keynesianism." Parliamentary Affairs (2010) 63#3 pp. 446–470.
 Hay, Colin. "The winter of discontent thirty years on." The Political Quarterly 80.4 (2009): 545–552.
 Hayter, Dianne. Fightback!: Labour's Traditional Right in the 1970s and 1980s (Manchester University Press, 2005).
 Heppell, Timothy. Choosing the Labour Leader: Labour Party Leadership Elections from Wilson to Brown (IB Tauris, 2010).
 Hickson, Kevin, and Anthony Seldon, eds. New Labour, Old Labour: The Wilson and Callaghan Governments 1974–1979 (Routledge, 2004).
 Holmes, Martin. The labour government, 1974–79: political aims and economic reality (Macmillan, 1985).
 Horn, Geoff. Crossing the floor: Reg Prentice and the crisis of British social democracy (Manchester University Press, 2013).
 Jones, Tudor. Remaking the Labour Party: From Gaitskell to Blair (Routledge, 2005).
 Kerr, Hugh. "Labour's Social Policy 1974–79." Critical Social Policy (1981) 1#1 pp. 5–17.
 Meredith, Stephen. Labours old and new: the parliamentary right of the British Labour Party 1970–79 and the roots of New Labour (Oxford University Press, 2008).
 Morgan, Kenneth O. Britain since 1945: The People's Peace (2nd ed. 2001), pp. 358–433.
 Morgan, Kenneth O. Callaghan: A Life (Oxford University Press, 1997).
 Pimlott, Ben. Harold Wilson (1992), the standard biography.
 Pryce, Sue. "James Callaghan 1976–9: A Caretaker." in Sue Pryce, Presidentializing the Premiership (Palgrave Macmillan, 1997), pp. 147–162.
 Rodgers, William. "Government Under Stress. Britain's Winter of Discontent 1979." Political Quarterly (1984) 55#2 pp. 171–179.
 Rogers, Chris. "From Social Contract to 'Social Contrick': The Depoliticisation of Economic Policy-Making under Harold Wilson, 1974–751." British Journal of Politics & International Relations (2009) 11#4 pp. 634–651. online
 Rosen, Greg. Dictionary of Labour Biography (Politico's Publishing, 2001).
 Rosen, Greg. Old Labour to New (Politico's Publishing, 2005).
 Shepherd, John.  Crisis? what crisis? : the Callaghan government and the British winter of discontent (Manchester University Press, 2013).
 Sked, Alan and Chris Cook. Post-War Britain: A Political History (4th ed. 1993), pp. 292–312
 Thomas, James. "'Bound in by history': The Winter of Discontent in British politics, 1979–2004." Media, Culture & Society 29#2 (2007): 263–283.
 Turner, Alwyn. Crisis? What Crisis?: Britain in the 1970s (2013), pp. 93–204.
 Wilson, Harold. Final term: the Labour government 1974–1976'' (Weidenfeld & Nicolson / Michael Joseph Ltd., 1979).
 

1974-1979
Government
1974 establishments in the United Kingdom
1979 disestablishments in the United Kingdom
Ministry 2
Ministry
Ministries of Elizabeth II
Cabinets established in 1974
Cabinets disestablished in 1979
1970s in the United Kingdom